Henri Buguet, a French historical and portrait painter, was born at Fresne (Seine-et-Marne) in 1761. He was a pupil of David, and painted in 1817 for the château of Pau 'Francis I. knighted by Bayard.' His portraits of Louis XVIII and Charles X have been engraved by Bertrand. He died in Paris about 1833.

References
 

18th-century French painters
French male painters
19th-century French painters
1761 births
1833 deaths
People from Seine-et-Marne
Pupils of Jacques-Louis David
18th-century French male artists